Tunna is both a given name and a surname, also a nickname. Notable people with the name include: 

Tunna Pandey, Indian politician
Norman Tunna (1908–1970), British railway worker
Tuomas "Tunna" Milonoff, Finnish media person, TV-show host, and writer

See also